Swinford is a town in County Mayo, Ireland.

Swinford may also refer to:
Places
Swinford, Leicestershire, England
Swinford, Oxfordshire, England
location of Swinford Toll Bridge
Swinford Glacier, Antarctica
Mount Swinford,  Antarctica
People
Swinford (surname)
Other
 Swinford Bandog, a dog breeding program

See also 
Old Swinford
Kingswinford